Lewis Weston Dillwyn, FRS (21 August 1778 – 31 August 1855) was a British porcelain manufacturer, naturalist and Whig Member of Parliament (MP).

Biography
He was born in Walthamstow, Essex, the eldest son of William Dillwyn (1743–1824) and Sarah Dillwyn (née Weston). His father, a Pennsylvanian Quaker had returned to Britain in 1777 during Philadelphia's worst period in the American War of Independence and settled at Higham Lodge, Walthamstow, Essex, UK. William Dillwyn was a vociferous anti-slavery campaigner and toured England and South Wales in his work for the Anti-Slavery Committee. William Dillwyn was related to George Haynes through the  Emlen and Physick families in Philadelphia and it is likely that the opportunity to buy the  Cambrian Pottery in Swansea, Wales, from Haynes came about through these family connections in America.

William's letters to his daughter Suzanna are held by the Library Company of Philadelphia and stored at the Historical Society of Pennsylvania. These letters show that the factory was bought by William to keep Lewis active while the latter was suffering from gout. The highlight of this period of production of Swansea Pottery was the opening by Lewis Weston Dillwyn and George Haynes of the Cambrian Company, the Swansea Potteries London Warehouse on Fleet Street which operated between 1806 and 1807. In 1814 the pottery took over the workforce of the Nantgarw Pottery and began to make porcelain.

Lewis Weston Dillwyn however was also renowned for his published works on botany and conchology, including his 1809 work The British Confervae, an illustrated study of British freshwater algae. Dillwyn is credited with discovering several species of the Conferva genus. Among the botanical illustrators of The British Confervae are the artists William Jackson Hooker, Ellen Hutchins and William Weston Young. He was elected in 1804 as a Fellow of the Royal Society.

In 1817 he temporarily retired from the pottery. In 1818 he became High Sheriff of Glamorgan and was elected to the First Reformed Parliament in 1834 as MP for Glamorganshire. He bought Sketty Hall near Swansea and was elected Mayor of Swansea in 1839. Dillwyn was also one of the founders of the Royal Institution of South Wales and its first President, and in 1840 he published a short history of Swansea.

He married Mary Adams, the daughter of Colonel John Llewelyn of Penllergaer, Llangyfelach in 1807. They had six children, including the noted photographer John Dillwyn Llewelyn (1810–1882), MP for Swansea Lewis Llewelyn Dillwyn (1814-1892) and pioneering female photographer Mary Dillwyn (1816-1906). His granddaughters by his son Lewis were the novelist and industrialist Amy Dillwyn, and lepidopterist Mary De la Beche Nicholl. His granddaughter by John was the Welsh astronomer and pioneer in scientific photography Thereza Dillwyn Llewelyn.

He died in Sketty Hall, Swansea, in 1855.

.

Honours
He is honoured in the names of several species including, Dillwynella which is a genus of sea snails, marine gastropod mollusks in the family Skeneidae named by Dall in 1889. Dillwynia, which is a genus of about 20 species of flowering plants in the family Fabaceae, and is endemic to Australia, named by Sm. in 1805.

Taxa
Taxa named by Dillwyn include:
 Lithopoma gibberosa, a species of sea snail

See also
 Dillwyn v Llewelyn, a legal case between his sons concerning his estate

References 

 ThePeerage.com
 Biography

Further reading

 A. R. Walker, 'The Dillwyns as naturalists: Lewis Weston Dillwyn (1778–1855)', in Minerva (Journal of Swansea History); 11, p. 20-42.

1778 births
1855 deaths
British industrialists
British Quakers
Conchologists
Teuthologists
Ceramics manufacturers of Wales
High Sheriffs of Glamorgan
Mayors of Swansea
Whig (British political party) MPs for Welsh constituencies
Fellows of the Royal Society
Fellows of the Linnean Society of London
UK MPs 1832–1835
UK MPs 1835–1837
Dillwyn family